Variante (Portuguese for "variant" and "difference")  was a Portuguese review published in the capital Lisbon from 1942 to 1943.

History and profile
The review was published by Editorial Inquérito (Editorial Survey), directed and edited by António Pedro, it produced two issues of the review: Spring 1942 and Winter 1943.  The eclectic spirit but pointedly poetic (if not surrealist), the review articulated with the editor's work, announced its first issue under the sign of a Nonconformist (Inconformismo), Fantasy (Fantasia), the second Bad Taste (Mau gosto), he third was Strength and Form (Força and Forma) and the fourth was Love (Amor) (this was the last that were publisher).

The arranged writings of António Pedro returned its modern quality of publications with Contemporânea review by José Pacheko (or Pacheco). Notable writers who worked with the review included Vitorino Nemésio, Adolfo Casais Monteiro, Diogo de Macedo, Sofia de Melo Breyner, José Régio, Manuel Mendes Delfim Santos and a couple of more. It was prematurely interrupted (for economic reasons and lack of cooperation of the elevation of the desired program), the publication was resumed in 1948 under the "International Surrealist Review", then directed by António Pedro, André Breton, V. Brauner, N, Celas and E.L.T. Mesens difficulties of the editorial order prevented the concretization of this project.

References

External links
Variante, Art Library (Biblioteca de Arte), Calouste Gulbenkian Foundation, Retrieved 11 January 2015 

1942 establishments in Portugal
1943 disestablishments in Portugal
Defunct literary magazines published in Europe
Defunct magazines published in Portugal
Magazines established in 1942
Magazines disestablished in 1943
Magazines published in Lisbon
Portuguese-language magazines
Literary magazines published in Portugal